The 1976 National Rowing Championships was the fifth edition of the National Championships, held from 16–18 July 1976 at the National Water Sports Centre in Holme Pierrepont, Nottingham. The Championships did not feature any of the British Olympic team members who were in Canada at the time.

Senior

Medal summary

Lightweight

Medal summary

Junior

Medal summary 

Key

References 

British Rowing Championships
British Rowing Championships
British Rowing Championships